Felix Ohis Uduokhai (born 9 September 1997) is a German professional footballer who plays as a defender for Bundesliga club FC Augsburg.

Club career
Uduokhai was born to a Nigerian father and German mother, and is a Germany youth international. In June 2017, after his previous team 1860 Munich had been relegated from 2. Bundesliga to fourth tier Regionalliga Bayern, Uduokhai  moved to Bundesliga side VfL Wolfsburg, signing a five-year-contract until 2022.

On 28 August 2019, it was announced that Uduokhai will be on loan to FC Augsburg until the end of the season.

On 4 June 2020, FC Augsburg confirmed they would use the option to buy in Uduokhai’s loan deal. He completed a permanent transfer to the club for a fee of €9 million.

International career 
Uduokhai has played several matches with the German U19, U20, and U21 national teams. Playing for Nigeria is still an option for Uduokhai, if he doesn’t get an any opportunities with Germany. He earned his first call-up for the German senior team on 6 November 2020.

Uduokhai was named in Germany's squad for the 2020 Summer Olympics, where he scored the winning goal in the team's second match, heading home from a Max Kruse corner to give Germany a 3–2 victory over Saudi Arabia.

References

External links
 
 

1997 births
Living people
People from Annaberg-Buchholz
German sportspeople of Nigerian descent
Footballers from Saxony
German footballers
Association football defenders
Germany youth international footballers
Germany under-21 international footballers
Olympic footballers of Germany
Footballers at the 2020 Summer Olympics
Bundesliga players
2. Bundesliga players
Regionalliga players
TSV 1860 Munich II players
TSV 1860 Munich players
VfL Wolfsburg players
FC Augsburg players